Epikoros (or Apikoros  or Apikores; , lit. "Epicurus", pl. Epicorsim) is a Jewish term figuratively meaning "a heretic", cited in the Mishnah, referring to one who does not have a share in the world to come:

The rabbinic literature uses the term Epikoros, without a specific reference to the Greek philosopher Epicurus, yet it is apparent that the term is derived from the Greek philosopher's name, a philosopher whose views contradicted Jewish scripture, the strictly monotheistic conception of God in Judaism and the Jewish belief in the world to come; see .

The Talmudic interpretation is that the Aramaic word is derived from the root-word  (PKR; lit. licentious), hence disrespect, and accordingly: 

According to Maimonides, scorning a Talmid Chacham is actually a singular case of disrespecting the entire Torah or its rabbinic scholar-sages. In his work Mishneh Torah (Yad, Teshuvah 3:8), Maimonides rules that an Epikoros is  a person who denies that God communicates with humans through prophecy, or one who denies the prophecy of Moses, or one who denies God's knowledge of the affairs of humans (i.e., one who maintains there is no divine providence). Maimonides probably encountered the name of Epicurus, the Greek philosopher, some time after composing his commentary on the Mishnah and before composing The Guide for the Perplexed. In the first source he erroneously states that the rabbinic term epikoros is an Aramaic word, but in the Guide he has already become aware of the atheistic doctrine of the philosopher by that name. He cites the source of his information as Alexander of Aphrodisias' treatise On Providence.

Following the Christian censorship of the Talmud, starting with the aftermath of the Disputation of Barcelona and during the Roman Inquisition and the Spanish Inquisition, the term spread within the Jewish classical texts. Censors shunned expressions like minim ("sectary"), which they viewed as referring to the Christian faith, and replaced them with the term Epikoros or Epicurus, hence a heretic, since the church would also fight the heretics. The censors also replaced terms that refer to Christians with the word akum, which stands for avodas kochavim. This term literally means "star worshippers", a belief that both Jews and their Christian censors abhorred.

See also
 Heresy in Judaism
 Heresy in Orthodox Judaism
 Tinok shenishba

References

Aramaic words and phrases in Jewish law
Epicureanism
Hebrew words and phrases
Hebrew words and phrases in Jewish law
Heresy in Judaism
Talmud concepts and terminology
Greek words and phrases in Jewish law